Adoor is a village in Kasaragod district in the Indian state of Kerala. Adoor is located 38 km east of Kasaragod town and 7 km away from State Highway 55 or Cherkala-Jalsoor road.

Demographics
As of 2011 Census, Adoor village had population of 15,482 which constitutes 7,667 males and 7,815 females. The sex ratio of Adoor was 1019 lower than state average of 1084. Population in the age group 0-6 was 1,710 (11%) where 911 are males and 799 are females. Adoor had an overall literacy of 83.2% lower than state average of 94%. The male literacy was 88.2% and female literacy was 78.4%.

Administration
Adoor village is part of Delampady Grama Panchayat under Karadka block panchayat. The village is politically part of Kasaragod (State Assembly constituency) under Kasaragod Loksabha.

Transportation
National Highway 66 passes through Kasaragod town which connects Goa and Mumbai on the northern side and Kochi and Thiruvananthapuram on the southern side. Cherkala-Jalsoor interstate highway gives access to cities and towns of neighbouring Karnataka state.
The nearest railway station is at Kasaragod on Shoranur-Mangalore Section under Southern railways. 
The nearest international airports are Kannur and Mangalore.

References

Cherkala - Jalsoor Rd
Villages in Kasaragod district